The William McFarland House is an historic house at 525 Salisbury Street in Worcester, Massachusetts.  It is a -story wood-frame Cape style structure, with a side-gable roof, central chimney, clapboard siding, and rubblestone foundation.  Its main facade is three bays wide, slightly asymmetrical, with a center entrance flanked by pilasters and topped by a modest entablature.  Probably built sometime between 1743 and 1759, the house is one of Worcester's oldest surviving structures.  It was probably built by William McFarland, Sr., a lieutenant in the American Revolutionary War, and remained in that family for over 100 years.

The house was listed on the National Register of Historic Places in 1980.

See also
National Register of Historic Places listings in northwestern Worcester, Massachusetts
National Register of Historic Places listings in Worcester County, Massachusetts

References

Houses completed in 1743
Houses in Worcester, Massachusetts
National Register of Historic Places in Worcester, Massachusetts
Houses on the National Register of Historic Places in Worcester County, Massachusetts
1743 establishments in Massachusetts